Job and Deborah Otis House, also known as East Otis Farm, is a historic home located at Sherwood in Cayuga County, New York.  It is a Federal-style dwelling built in 1796. It consists of a 2-story, three-bay, side-hall main block with a -story side ell. Also on the property is a mid- to late-19th-century carriage house, now converted into a two car garage.  During the 1840s the dwelling was home to Job and Deborah Otis, who were Orthodox Quakers and leaders of the Otisites. Their granddaughter was the painter Amy Otis.

It was listed on the National Register of Historic Places in 2008.

References

External links

Houses on the National Register of Historic Places in New York (state)
Federal architecture in New York (state)
Houses completed in 1815
Houses in Cayuga County, New York
1815 establishments in New York (state)
National Register of Historic Places in Cayuga County, New York